Kalani Brown (born March 21, 1997) is an American professional basketball player for the Dallas Wings of the Women's National Basketball Association (WNBA) and for Hatayspor. She has received multiple honors during her playing career, and was named an All-American by the Women's Basketball Coaches Association (WBCA) following the 2017 and 2018 seasons.

Personal
Brown is the daughter of DeJuna (Dee) and former NBA veteran and champion with the Boston Celtics, P. J. Brown. She has two sisters, Briana and Whitney, and a brother, Javani. Both of her parents played for Louisiana Tech University, and her mother was an assistant coach at Salmen High School. In December 2018, Salmen retired Kalani Brown's number. In 2015, she was named a McDonald's All-American during her senior year at the school. At Baylor, she majored in communications studies.

WNBA career statistics

Regular season

|-
| align="left" | 2019
| align="left" | Los Angeles
| 28 || 0 || 13.5 || .478 || .000 || .783 || 3.5 || 0.6 || 0.3 || 0.8 || 1.0 || 5.1
|-
| align="left" | 2020
| align="left" | Atlanta
| 10 || 0 || 6.1 || .522 || .000 || .600 || 1.2 || 0.0 || 0.1 || 0.1 || 0.5 || 3.0
|-
| align="left" | 2021
| align="left" | Atlanta
| 1 || 0 || 5.0 || .333 || .000 || .000 || 1.0 || 0.0 || 0.0 || 0.0 || 0.0 || 2.0
|-
| align="left" | Career
| align="left" | 3 years, 2 teams
| 39 || 0 || 11.4 || .482 || .000 || .750 || 2.8 || 0.4 || 0.3 || 0.6 || 0.9 || 4.5

Playoffs

|-
| align="left" | 2019
| align="left" | Los Angeles
| 3 || 0 || 5.7 || 1.000 || .000 || .500 || 2.0 || 0.3 || 0.0 || 0.3 || 0.7 || 4.3
|-
| align="left" | Career
| align="left" | 1 year, 1 team
| 3 || 0 || 5.7 || 1.000 || .000 || .500 || 2.0 || 0.3 || 0.0 || 0.3 || 0.7 || 4.3

Baylor statistics

Source

References

External links
Baylor Lady Bears bio

1997 births
Living people
All-American college women's basketball players
American women's basketball players
Atlanta Dream players
Basketball players from Louisiana
Baylor Bears women's basketball players
Centers (basketball)
Los Angeles Sparks draft picks
Los Angeles Sparks players
McDonald's High School All-Americans
People from Slidell, Louisiana